Ælfthryth, also known as Alfreda, Alfritha, Aelfnryth, or Etheldritha, is a saint, virgin, and recluse, venerated in both the Roman Catholic Church and Antiochian Orthodox Church.  She was a daughter of King Offa of Mercia and his consort, Cynethryth.

Ælfthryth was "either betrothed to or loved by" St. Ethelbert, the king of the East Angles.  In 793, after visiting Ælfthyth, he was taken captive and murdered by her mother so that Cynethryth's brother could ascend to the throne instead; Ælfthryth's was horrified by the murder, so she departed the court and retired to the Crowland Abbey in the marshes of Crowland, where she lived as a recluse for 40 years, until her death of natural causes in 835.  Ælfthryth's sister Aelfreda also lost a husband due to their parents' political intrigue.

According to the Oxford Dictionary of Saints, Ælfthryth was "famous for her prophecies".  Her tomb was arranged around St. Guthlac's.  A Crowland tradition states that Ælfthryth's relics were destroyed in 870 when Danes destroyed the abbey, but there is little evidence for it.  Her feast day is 2 August.

References 

8th-century births
795 deaths
Anglo-Saxon royalty
Mercian saints
People from Crowland
8th-century Christian saints
8th-century English women
House of Icel
8th-century English people
Female saints of medieval England